The 2016 Chinese Taipei Figure Skating Championships took place between 1 and 2 August 2016 at the Taipei Arena in Taipei. Skaters competed in the disciplines of men's singles and ladies' singles on the senior, junior, and novice levels.

Senior results

Men

Ladies

Junior results

Men

Ladies

References

External links
 Results - Chinese Taipei Skating Union
 Entry list - Chinese Taipei Skating Union
 Chinese Taipei Figure Skating

Chinese Taipei Figure Skating Championships
Chinese Taipei Figure Skating Championships, 2016